The Udaya Film Awards is the most prominent award ceremony for Kannada films presented annually by Udaya TV, a Kannada-language division of the Sun Network, from the south-Indian state of Karnataka. The awards ceremony has been instituted to honour both artistic and technical excellence in the Kannada language film industry. Held since 1998, the ceremony was discontinued for over 6 years and made its comeback in 2006. The sponsors have been made by Knockout and Sun Feast before and currently by Vivel Active.

Best Actor
The Udaya Film Award for Best Male Actor has been awarded since 1998.

Best Actress
The Udaya Film Award for Best Female Actor has been awarded since 1998.

Best Director
The Udaya Film Award for Best Director has been awarded since 1998.

Best Film
The Udaya Film Award for Best Film has been awarded since 1998.

Best Supporting Actor
The Udaya Film Award for Best Supporting Male Actor has been awarded since 2006.

Best Supporting Actress
The Udaya Film Award for Best Supporting Female Actor has been awarded since 1997.

Best Music Director
The Udaya Film Award for Best Music Director has been awarded since 2006.

Best Male Playback Singer
The Udaya Film Award for Best Male Playback Singer has been awarded since 2006.

Best Female Playback Singer
The Udaya Film Award for Best Female Playback Singer has been awarded since 2006.

Best Cinematographer

References

External links
 
 
 
 
 

Indian film awards
Kannada-language films
Lifetime achievement awards
1997 establishments in Karnataka
Karnataka awards